The Further Adventures of Tennessee Buck is a 1988 Sri Lankan-American adventure comedy film directed by and starring David Keith.

Cast
David Keith as Buck Malone
Kathy Shower as Barbara Manchester
Brant Van Hoffman as Ken Manchester
Sydney Lassick as Wolfgang Meyer
Somy Rathnayake
Sumith Mudannayake
Pearl Vasudevi
Piyadasa Wijekoon as Tribe chief

Plot
The Further Adventures of Tennessee Buck is a 1988 action/comedy film starring David Keith, Kathy Shower and Brant von Hoffman. The movie begins with millionaire hunter Ken Manchester (Hoffman) and his new wife Barbara(Shower) floating down a river in Borneo on their way to their honeymoon safari. In the village where they are to meet their guide, they come across "Tennessee" Buck Malone (Keith), a once legendary hunter now down on his luck.

In the village, an elephant goes on a rampage, nearly killing Barbara. She is saved by Buck, who shoots the elephant; only problem being that the elephant falls on and kills the Manchester's safari guide. Buck is arrested for shooting the elephant, and the Magistrate gives Buck a choice. Pay a fine that is so high that Buck can't possibly come up with the money, or give the Magistrate a talisman that Buck wears around his neck; the Magistrate covets the charm, but Buck refuses to give it up. Fortunately, Ken comes to the jail and offers to pay Buck's fine in exchange for Buck taking the couple on a safari. Buck reluctantly agrees.

Buck and his assistant, Sinanga, fly the couple to a location where a tribe that Buck is friendly with give them shelter and guides for the safari. The next day, they fly to a remote spot to begin hunting, only to discover that a rival tribe has expanded it's claims into the territory where they are hunting. Before they can escape, the party is ambushed, and Buck, the Manchesters and Sinanga are taken prisoner. The chief of the tribe is the son of the chief whom Buck befriended years earlier. On seeing the prisoners, the chief wants two things: Buck's talisman and Barabara Manchester. He is thwarted for two reasons: To get the talisman, he either has to kill Buck or Buck has to give it to him. The Chief, however, is constantly put off by his mother, who also recognizes Buck and loudly reminds the village of how Buck had saved them all. As for Barbara, the chief cannot have her while her husband, Ken, lives.

The chief, desiring Barbara, has her taken to his hut to be prepared by the village women to be his new wife through a special oil rubdown. There, she is stripped naked and the women rub oil all over her body. He then sets Ken loose, with the idea that Ken will try to escape, and the chief's men will hunt him down and kill him. Buck persuades the chief to also set loose Sinanga. Buck warns Ken to follow Sinanga's lead, but Ken refuses to take orders from a native. Ultimately, Ken runs the wrong way and is killed by the chief's men. The chief later presents Barabra, who is sitting naked in a hut, with Ken's head. According to tribal law, she is now his, and he rapes her. Buck, hearing her screams, realizes that his plan has failed.

Buck is later set free by the chief's mother, who gives him a machete as a weapon. He sneaks into the chief's hut and frees Barbara, but before they can sneak out, Barbara grabs a spear and stabs the chief, wounding him. Buck and Barbara race through the jungle back to Buck's plane, where they find Sinanga hiding. They escape, but before they leave, Buck circles the plane and drops his talisman into the young chief's hands. Sinanga begins to explain about Ken's death, but Buck tells him he has no need to explain.

The rubdown and rape scenes

The rubdown scene is considered by many viewers to be the highlight of the movie. In this scene, Barbara has been stripped naked by the women of the tribe (her belt, boots, trousers, shirt and pants get removed) and is forced to lay down on a bed of animal skins. While she is held down, the women rub oil all over her body. The scene begins at Barbara's feet, where two women are oiling up her legs. The camera moves upwards and we see another tribal woman rubbing oil onto her abdomen. Finally, the camera moves to Barbara's head and torso, where one woman is rubbing oil onto her breasts, while another woman holds her down by pinning her arms. The scene is repeated, this time with cutouts showing the tribal women's faces as they give Barbara her rubdown.The scene where Barbara is rubbed with oil and raped by village chief was much longer and more sexual in the rough cut of the film that was submitted to the MPAA who gave it X rating.

In the original uncut scene she was being held by two native women in front of the chief's mother while the other two women remove her clothes and scatter it on floor as the chief's mother looks on. They then pin Barbara onto a table and begin to rub her in oil. The oil rubdown is a few minutes longer and more erotic, the native women rub oil aggressively in between Barbara's thighs and her hips respond by grinding back vigorously. There was more strong breast kneading and squeezing with Barbara's erect nipples being tweaked and pulled. Barbara moans a few times to the point of orgasm while this happens, before she eventually does climax. After the scene when the chief arrives and throws Barbara's husband's decapitated head at her, he then forces her in position with her rear up in the air before the rape scene, which was also much longer and graphic.

Extra longer sex scenes
The first is of Barbara, having been oiled up extensively by the native women, lying on her front with her rear slightly raised with the chief taking her from behind. There is a wide shot of this happening that is not in the official version. The next sex scene occurs after the chief enters the hut with a naked oiled up Barbara sitting on the ground. He glares at her as Barbara backs up to the hut's wall and says in an angry tone "What do you want?" The chief then throws the head of her husband at her. This scene is extended with the chief having sex with Barbara a second time except this time Barbara is lying on her back and the chief is on top of her.

The scenes were cut and edited so that the resubmitted film would get a R rating from the MPAA.

Reception
Leonard Maltin awarded the film two and a half stars.

References

External links
 
 

American adventure comedy films
Films scored by John Debney
Sri Lankan comedy films
1980s English-language films
1980s American films